

Events

Pre-1600
1284 – The Republic of Pisa is defeated in the Battle of Meloria by the Republic of Genoa, thus losing its naval dominance in the Mediterranean.
1538 – Bogotá, Colombia, is founded by Gonzalo Jiménez de Quesada.

1601–1900
1661 – The Treaty of The Hague is signed by Portugal and the Dutch Republic.
1777 – American Revolutionary War: The bloody Battle of Oriskany prevents American relief of the Siege of Fort Stanwix.
1787 – Sixty proof sheets of the Constitution of the United States are delivered to the Constitutional Convention in Philadelphia, Pennsylvania.
1806 – Francis II, Holy Roman Emperor, declares the moribund empire to be dissolved, although he retains power in the Austrian Empire.
1819 – Norwich University is founded in Vermont as the first private military school in the United States.
1824 – Peruvian War of Independence: The Battle of Junín.
1825 – The Bolivian Declaration of Independence is proclaimed.
1861 – Britain imposes the Lagos Treaty of Cession to suppress slavery in what is now Nigeria.
1862 – American Civil War: The Confederate ironclad  is scuttled on the Mississippi River after suffering catastrophic engine failure near Baton Rouge, Louisiana.
1870 – Franco-Prussian War: The Battle of Spicheren is fought, resulting in a German victory.
  1870   – Franco-Prussian War: The Battle of Wörth results in a decisive German victory.
1890 – At Auburn Prison in New York, murderer William Kemmler becomes the first person to be executed by electric chair.

1901–present
1901 – Kiowa land in Oklahoma is opened for white settlement, effectively dissolving the contiguous reservation.
1914 – World War I: U-boat campaign: Two days after the United Kingdom had declared war on Germany over the German invasion of Belgium, ten German U-boats leave their base in Heligoland to attack Royal Navy warships in the North Sea.
  1914   – World War I: Serbia declares war on Germany; Austria declares war on Russia.
1915 – World War I: Battle of Sari Bair: The Allies mount a diversionary attack timed to coincide with a major Allied landing of reinforcements at Suvla Bay.
1917 – World War I: Battle of Mărășești between the Romanian and German armies begins.
1926 – Gertrude Ederle becomes the first woman to swim across the English Channel.
  1926   – In New York City, the Warner Bros.' Vitaphone system premieres with the movie Don Juan starring John Barrymore.
1940 – Estonia becomes part of the Soviet Union.
1942 – Queen Wilhelmina of the Netherlands becomes the first reigning queen to address a joint session of the United States Congress.
1944 – The Warsaw Uprising occurs on August 1. It is brutally suppressed and all able-bodied men in Kraków are detained afterwards to prevent a similar uprising, the Kraków Uprising, that was planned but never carried out.
1945 – World War II: Hiroshima, Japan is devastated when the atomic bomb "Little Boy" is dropped by the United States B-29 Enola Gay. Around 70,000 people are killed instantly, and some tens of thousands die in subsequent years from burns and radiation poisoning.
1956 – After going bankrupt in 1955, the American broadcaster DuMont Television Network makes its final broadcast, a boxing match from St. Nicholas Arena in New York in the Boxing from St. Nicholas Arena series.
1958 – Law of Permanent Defense of Democracy, outlawing the Communist Party of Chile and banning 26,650 persons from the electoral lists, is repealed in Chile.
1960 – Cuban Revolution: Cuba nationalizes American and foreign-owned property in the nation.
1962 – Jamaica becomes independent from the United Kingdom.
1965 – US President Lyndon B. Johnson signs the Voting Rights Act of 1965 into law.
1986 – A low-pressure system that redeveloped off the New South Wales coast dumps a record 328 millimeters (13 inches) of rain in a day on Sydney, New South Wales, Australia.
1990 – Gulf War: The United Nations Security Council orders a global trade embargo against Iraq in response to Iraq's invasion of Kuwait.
1991 – Tim Berners-Lee releases files describing his idea for the World Wide Web. WWW makes its first appearance as a publicly available service on the Internet.
  1991   – Takako Doi, chair of the Social Democratic Party, becomes Japan's first female speaker of the House of Representatives.
1996 – The Ramones played their farewell concert at The Palace, Los Angeles, CA. 
  1996   – NASA announces that the ALH 84001 meteorite, thought to originate from Mars, contains evidence of primitive life-forms.
1997 – Korean Air Flight 801 crashed at Nimitz Hill, Guam killing 228 of 254 people on board.
2001 – Erwadi fire incident: Twenty-eight mentally ill persons tied to a chain are burnt to death at a faith based institution at Erwadi, Tamil Nadu.
2008 – A military junta led by Mohamed Ould Abdel Aziz stages a coup d'état in Mauritania, overthrowing president Sidi Ould Cheikh Abdallahi.
2010 – Flash floods across a large part of Jammu and Kashmir, India, damages 71 towns and kills at least 255 people.
2011 – War in Afghanistan: A United States military helicopter is shot down, killing 30 American special forces members and a working dog, seven Afghan soldiers, and one Afghan civilian. It was the deadliest single event for the United States in the War in Afghanistan.
2012 – NASA's Curiosity rover lands on the surface of Mars.
2015 – A suicide bomb attack kills at least 15 people at a mosque in the Saudi city of Abha.

Births

Pre-1600
1180 – Emperor Go-Toba of Japan (d. 1239)
1504 – Matthew Parker, English archbishop (d. 1575)
1572 – Fakhr-al-Din II, Ottoman prince (d. 1635)

1601–1900
1605 – Bulstrode Whitelocke, English lawyer (d. 1675)
1609 – Richard Bennett, English-American politician, Colonial Governor of Virginia (d. 1675)
1619 – Barbara Strozzi, Italian composer and singer-songwriter (d. 1677)
1622 – Tjerk Hiddes de Vries, Dutch admiral (d. 1666)
1638 – Nicolas Malebranche, French priest and philosopher (d. 1715)
1644 – Louise de La Vallière, French mistress of Louis XIV of France (d. 1710)
1651 – François Fénelon, French archbishop and poet (d. 1715)
1656 – Claude de Forbin, French general (d. 1733)
1666 – Maria Sophia of Neuburg (d. 1699)
1667 – Johann Bernoulli, Swiss mathematician (d. 1748)
1697 – Charles VII, Holy Roman Emperor (d. 1745)
1715 – Luc de Clapiers, marquis de Vauvenargues, French author (d. 1747)
1765 – Petros Mavromichalis, Greek general and politician, 2nd Prime Minister of Greece (d. 1848)
1766 – William Hyde Wollaston, English chemist and physicist (d. 1828)
1768 – Jean-Baptiste Bessières, French general and politician (d. 1813)
1775 – Daniel O'Connell, Irish lawyer and politician, Lord Mayor of Dublin (d. 1847)
1809 – Alfred, Lord Tennyson, English poet (d. 1892)
1826 – Thomas Alexander Browne, English-Australian author (d. 1915)
1835 – Hjalmar Kiærskou, Danish botanist (d. 1900)
1844 – Alfred, Duke of Saxe-Coburg and Gotha (d. 1900)
  1844   – James Henry Greathead, South African-English engineer (d. 1896)
1848 – Susie Taylor, American writer and first black Army nurse (d. 1912)
1846 – Anna Haining Bates, Canadian-American giant (d. 1888)
1868 – Paul Claudel, French poet and playwright (d. 1955)
1874 – Charles Fort, American author (d. 1932)
1877 – Wallace H. White Jr., American lawyer and politician (d. 1952)
1880 – Hans Moser, Austrian actor and singer (d. 1964)
1881 – Leo Carrillo, American actor (d. 1961)
  1881   – Alexander Fleming, Scottish biologist, pharmacologist, and botanist, Nobel Prize laureate (d. 1955)
  1881   – Louella Parsons, American journalist (d. 1972)
1883 – Constance Georgina Adams, South African botanist (d. 1968)
  1883   – Scott Nearing, American economist and educator (d. 1983)
1886 – Edward Ballantine, American composer and academic (d. 1971)
1887 – Dudley Benjafield, English racing driver (d. 1957)
1889 – George Kenney, Canadian-American general (d. 1977)
  1889   – John Middleton Murry, English poet and author (d. 1957)
1890 – Wentworth Beaumont, 2nd Viscount Allendale, English captain and politician, Lord Lieutenant of Northumberland (d. 1956)
1891 – William Slim, 1st Viscount Slim, English field marshal and politician, 13th Governor-General of Australia (d. 1970)
1892 – Hoot Gibson, American actor, director, and producer (d. 1962)
1893 – Wright Patman, American lieutenant and politician (d. 1976)
  1895   – Frank Nicklin, Australian politician, 28th Premier of Queensland (d. 1978)
1900 – Cecil Howard Green, English-American geophysicist and businessman, co-founded Texas Instruments (d. 2003)

1901–present
1901 – Dutch Schultz, American gangster (d. 1935)
1903 – Virginia Foster Durr, American civil rights activist (d. 1999)
1904 – Jean Dessès, Greek-Egyptian fashion designer (d. 1970)
  1904   – Henry Iba, American basketball player and coach (d. 1993)
1906 – Vic Dickenson, American trombonist (d. 1984)
1908 – Maria Ludwika Bernhard,  Polish classical archaeologist and a  member of WWII Polish resistance (d. 1998)
  1908   – Helen Jacobs, American tennis player and commander (d. 1997)
  1908   – Lajos Vajda, Hungarian painter and illustrator (d. 1941)
1909 – Diana Keppel, Countess of Albemarle (d. 2013)
1910 – Adoniran Barbosa, Brazilian musician, singer, composer, humorist, and actor (d. 1982)
  1910   – Charles Crichton, English director, producer, and screenwriter (d. 1999)
1911 – Lucille Ball, American actress, television producer and businesswoman (d. 1989)
  1911   – Norman Gordon, South African cricketer (d. 2014) 
  1911   – Constance Heaven, English author and actress (d. 1995)
1912 – Richard C. Miller, American photographer (d. 2010)
1914 – Gordon Freeth, Australian lawyer and politician, 24th Australian Minister for Foreign Affairs (d. 2001) 
1916 – Richard Hofstadter, American historian and academic (d. 1970)
  1916   – Dom Mintoff, Maltese journalist and politician, 8th Prime Minister of Malta (d. 2012)
1917 – Barbara Cooney, American author and illustrator (d. 2000)
  1917   – Robert Mitchum, American actor (d. 1997)
1918 – Norman Granz, American-Swiss record producer and manager (d. 2001)
1919 – Pauline Betz, American tennis player (d. 2011)
1920 – John Graves, American author (d. 2013)
  1920   – Ella Raines, American actress (d. 1988)
1922 – Freddie Laker, English businessman, founded Laker Airways (d. 2006)
  1922   – Dan Walker, American lawyer and politician, 36th Governor of Illinois (d. 2015)
1923 – Jess Collins, American painter (d. 2004)
  1923   – Paul Hellyer, Canadian engineer and politician, 16th Canadian Minister of Defence (d. 2021)
1924 – Samuel Bowers, American activist, co-founded the White Knights of the Ku Klux Klan (d. 2006)
1926 – Elisabeth Beresford, English journalist and author (d. 2010)
  1926   – Frank Finlay, English actor (d. 2016)
  1926   – Clem Labine, American baseball player and manager (d. 2007)
  1926   – János Rózsás, Hungarian author (d. 2012)
  1926   – Norman Wexler, American screenwriter (d. 1999) 
1928 – Herb Moford, American baseball player (d. 2005)
  1928   – Andy Warhol, American painter, photographer and film director (d. 1987)
1929 – Mike Elliott, Jamaican saxophonist 
  1929   – Roch La Salle, Canadian politician, 42nd Canadian Minister of Public Works (d. 2007)
1930 – Abbey Lincoln, American singer-songwriter and actress (d. 2010)
1931 – Chalmers Johnson, American scholar and author (d. 2010)
1932 – Michael Deeley, English screenwriter and producer
  1932   – Howard Hodgkin, English painter (d. 2017)
  1932   – Charles Wood, English playwright and screenwriter (d. 2020)
1933 – A. G. Kripal Singh, Indian cricketer (d. 1987)
1934 – Piers Anthony, English-American soldier and author
  1934   – Chris Bonington, English mountaineer and author
  1934   – Billy Boston, Welsh rugby player and soldier
1935 – Fortunato Baldelli, Italian cardinal (d. 2012)
  1935   – Octavio Getino, Spanish-Argentinian director and screenwriter (d. 2012)
1937 – Baden Powell de Aquino, Brazilian guitarist and composer (d. 2000)
  1937   – Charlie Haden, American bassist and composer (d. 2014)
  1937   – Barbara Windsor, English actress (d. 2020)
1938 – Paul Bartel, American actor, director, and screenwriter (d. 2000)  
  1938   – Peter Bonerz, American actor and director
  1938   – Bert Yancey, American golfer (d. 1994)
1940 – Mukhu Aliyev, Russian philologist and politician, 2nd President of Dagestan
  1940   – Egil Kapstad, Norwegian pianist and composer (d. 2017)
  1940   – Louise Sorel, American actress
1941 – Ray Culp, American baseball player
1942 – Byard Lancaster, American saxophonist and flute player (d. 2012)
1943 – Jon Postel, American computer scientist and academic (d. 1998)
1944 – Inday Badiday, Filipino journalist and actress (d. 2003)
  1944   – Michael Mingos, English chemist and academic
  1944   – Martin Wharton, English bishop
1945 – Ron Jones, English director and production manager (d. 1993)
1946 – Allan Holdsworth, English guitarist, songwriter, and producer (d. 2017)
1947 – Radhia Cousot, French computer scientist and academic (d. 2014)
1949 – Dino Bravo, Italian-Canadian wrestler (d. 1993) 
1950 – Dorian Harewood, American actor 
1951 – Catherine Hicks, American actress
  1951   – Daryl Somers, Australian television host and singer
1952 – Pat MacDonald, American singer-songwriter and guitarist 
  1952   – David McLetchie, Scottish lawyer and politician (d. 2013)
  1952   – Ton Scherpenzeel, Dutch keyboard player, songwriter, and producer 
1954 – Mark Hughes, English-Australian rugby league player
1956 – Bill Emmott, English journalist and author
1957 – Bob Horner, American baseball player
  1957   – Jim McGreevey, American lawyer and politician, 52nd Governor of New Jersey
  1958   – Randy DeBarge, American singer-songwriter and bass player 
1959 – Rajendra Singh, Indian environmentalist 
1960 – Dale Ellis, American basketball player
1961 – Mary Ann Sieghart, English journalist and radio host
1962 – Michelle Yeoh, Malaysian-Hong Kong actress and producer
1963 – Charles Ingram, English soldier, author, and game show contestant
  1963   – Kevin Mitnick, American computer hacker and author
1964 – Kemi Omololu-Olunloyo, Nigerian journalist, activist, social media expert, and pharmacist
1965 – Stéphane Peterhansel, French racing driver
  1965   – Yuki Kajiura, Japanese pianist and composer 
  1965   – David Robinson, American basketball player and lieutenant
  1965   – Vince Wells, English cricketer 
1967 – Lorna Fitzsimons, English businesswoman and politician
  1967   – Mike Greenberg, American journalist and sportscaster
  1967   – Julie Snyder, Canadian talk show host and producer
1968 – Jack de Gier, Dutch footballer
1969 – Simon Doull, New Zealand cricketer and sportscaster
  1969   – Elliott Smith, American singer-songwriter and guitarist (d. 2003)
1970 – M. Night Shyamalan, Indian-American director, producer, and screenwriter 
1972 – Geri Halliwell, English singer-songwriter, dancer, and actress 
  1972   – Ray Lucas, American football player and sportscaster
1973 – Vera Farmiga, American actress
  1973   – Stuart O'Grady, Australian cyclist 
1974 – Bobby Petta, Dutch footballer
  1974   – Luis Vizcaíno, Dominican baseball player
  1974   – Alvin Williams, American basketball player and coach
1975 – Jason Crump, English-Australian motorcycle racer
  1975   – Renate Götschl, Austrian skier
  1975   – Víctor Zambrano, Venezuelan baseball player
1976 – Melissa George, Australian-American actress
1977 – Leandro Amaral, Brazilian footballer
  1977   – Jimmy Nielsen, Danish footballer and manager
  1977   – Luciano Zavagno, Argentinian footballer
1978 – Marvel Smith, American football player
1979 – Francesco Bellotti, Italian cyclist
  1979   – Jaime Correa, Mexican footballer 
  1979   – Travis Reed, American basketball player
1981 – Diána Póth, Hungarian figure skater
1983 – Robin van Persie, Dutch footballer
1984 – Vedad Ibišević, Bosnian footballer
  1984   – Maja Ognjenović, Serbian volleyball player
  1984   – Jesse Ryder, New Zealand cricketer
1985 – Mickaël Delage, French cyclist
  1985   – Bafétimbi Gomis, French footballer
  1985   – Garrett Weber-Gale, American swimmer
1986 – Raphael Pyrasch, German rugby player
1987 – Leanne Crichton, Scottish footballer
1991 – Jiao Liuyang, Chinese swimmer
1995 – Rebecca Peterson, Swedish tennis player
1999 – Rebeka Masarova, Spanish-Swiss tennis player

Deaths

Pre-1600
 258 – Pope Sixtus II
 523 – Pope Hormisdas (b. 450)
 750 – Marwan II, Umayyad general and caliph (b. 688)
1027 – Richard III, Duke of Normandy
1162 – Ramon Berenguer IV, Count of Barcelona (b. 1113)
1195 – Henry the Lion, Duke of Saxony and Bavaria (b. 1129)
1221 – Saint Dominic, Spanish priest, founded the Dominican Order (b. 1170)
1272 – Stephen V of Hungary (b. 1239)
1384 – Francesco I of Lesbos
1412 – Margherita of Durazzo, Queen consort of Charles III of Naples (b. 1347)
1414 – Ladislaus of Naples (b. 1377)
1458 – Pope Callixtus III (b. 1378)
1530 – Jacopo Sannazaro, Italian poet (b. 1458)
1553 – Girolamo Fracastoro, Italian physician (b. 1478)
1588 – Josias I, Count of Waldeck-Eisenberg, Count of Waldeck-Eisenberg (1578-1588) (b. 1554)

1601–1900
1628 – Johannes Junius, German lawyer and politician (b. 1573)
1637 – Ben Jonson, English poet and playwright (b. 1572)
1645 – Lionel Cranfield, 1st Earl of Middlesex, English merchant and politician (b. 1575)
1657 – Bohdan Khmelnytsky, Ukrainian soldier and politician, 1st Hetman of Zaporizhian Host (b. 1595)
1660 – Diego Velázquez, Spanish painter and educator (b. 1599)
1666 – Tjerk Hiddes de Vries, Frisian naval hero and commander (b. 1622)
1679 – John Snell, Scottish-English soldier and philanthropist, founded the Snell Exhibition (b. 1629)
1694 – Antoine Arnauld, French mathematician and philosopher (b. 1612)
1695 – François de Harlay de Champvallon, French archbishop (b. 1625)
1753 – Georg Wilhelm Richmann, Estonian-Russian physicist and academic (b. 1711)
1757 – Ádám Mányoki, Hungarian painter (b. 1673)
1794 – Henry Bathurst, 2nd Earl Bathurst, English lawyer and politician, Lord High Chancellor of Great Britain (b. 1714)
1815 – James A. Bayard, American lawyer and politician (b. 1767)
1828 – Konstantin von Benckendorff, Russian general and diplomat (b. 1785)
1850 – Edward Walsh, Irish poet and songwriter (b. 1805)
1866 – John Mason Neale, English priest, scholar, and hymnwriter (b. 1818)
1881 – James Springer White, American religious leader, co-founded the Seventh-day Adventist Church (b. 1821)
1893 – Jean-Jacques Challet-Venel, Swiss lawyer and politician (b. 1811)

1901–present
1904 – Eduard Hanslick, Austrian author and critic (b. 1825)
1906 – George Waterhouse, English-New Zealand politician, 7th Prime Minister of New Zealand (b. 1824)
1915 – Jennie de la Montagnie Lozier, American physician (b. 1841)
1920 – Stefan Bastyr, Polish pilot and author (b. 1890)
1925 – Surendranath Banerjee, Indian academic and politician (b. 1848)
  1925   – Gregorio Ricci-Curbastro, Italian mathematician (b. 1853)
1931 – Bix Beiderbecke, American cornet player, pianist, and composer (b. 1903)
1945 – Richard Bong, American soldier and pilot, Medal of Honor recipient (b. 1920)
  1945   – Hiram Johnson, American lawyer and politician, 23rd Governor of California (b. 1866)
1946 – Tony Lazzeri, American baseball player and coach (b. 1903)
1952 – Betty Allan, Australian statistician and biometrician (b. 1905)
1959 – Preston Sturges, American director, screenwriter, and playwright (b. 1898)
1964 – Cedric Hardwicke, English actor and director (b. 1893)
1969 – Theodor W. Adorno, German sociologist and philosopher (b. 1903)
1970 – Nikos Tsiforos, Greek director and screenwriter (b. 1912)
1973 – Fulgencio Batista, Cuban colonel and politician, 9th President of Cuba (b. 1901)
1976 – Gregor Piatigorsky, Russian-American cellist and educator (b. 1903)
1978 – Pope Paul VI (b. 1897)
  1978   – Edward Durell Stone, American architect, designed Radio City Music Hall and the Kennedy Center (b. 1902)
1979 – Feodor Felix Konrad Lynen, German biochemist and academic, Nobel Prize laureate (b. 1911)
1983 – Klaus Nomi, German singer-songwriter and actor (b. 1944)
1985 – Forbes Burnham, Guyanese politician, 2nd President of Guyana (b. 1923)
1986 – Emilio Fernández, Mexican actor, director, and screenwriter (b. 1904)
1987 – Ira C. Eaker, American general (b. 1896)
1990 – Jacques Soustelle, French anthropologist and politician (b. 1912)
1991 – Shapour Bakhtiar, Iranian soldier and politician, 74th Prime Minister of Iran (b. 1915)
  1991   – Roland Michener, Canadian lawyer and politician, 20th Governor General of Canada (b. 1900)
  1991   – Harry Reasoner, American journalist, co-created 60 Minutes (b. 1923)
1992 – Leszek Błażyński, Polish boxer (b. 1949)
1993 – Tex Hughson, American baseball player (b. 1916)
1994 – Domenico Modugno, Italian singer-songwriter and politician (b. 1928)
1997 – Shin Ki-ha, South Korean lawyer and politician (b. 1941)
1998 – André Weil, French-American mathematician and academic (b. 1906)
2001 – Jorge Amado, Brazilian novelist and poet (b. 1912)
  2001   – Adhar Kumar Chatterji, Indian Naval officer (b. 1914)
  2001   – Wilhelm Mohnke, German general (b. 1911)
  2001   – Shan Ratnam, Sri Lankan physician and academic (b. 1928)
  2001   – Dorothy Tutin, English actress (b. 1930)
2002 – Edsger W. Dijkstra, Dutch physicist, computer scientist, and academic (b. 1930)
2003 – Julius Baker, American flute player and educator (b. 1915)
2004 – Rick James, American singer-songwriter and producer (b. 1948)
  2004   – Donald Justice, American poet and academic (b. 1925)
2005 – Robin Cook, Scottish educator and politician, Secretary of State for Foreign and Commonwealth Affairs (b. 1946)
2007 – Zsolt Daczi, Hungarian guitarist (b. 1969)
2008 – Angelos Kitsos, Greek lawyer and author (b. 1934)
2009 – Riccardo Cassin, Italian mountaineer and author (b. 1909)
  2009   – Willy DeVille,  American singer-songwriter and guitarist (b. 1950)
  2009   – John Hughes,  American director, producer, and screenwriter (b. 1950)
2011 – Fe del Mundo, Filipino pediatrician and educator (b. 1911)
2012 – Richard Cragun, American-Brazilian ballet dancer and choreographer (b. 1944)
  2012   – Marvin Hamlisch, American pianist, composer, and conductor (b. 1944)
  2012   – Robert Hughes, Australian-American author and critic (b. 1938)
  2012   – Bernard Lovell, English physicist and astronomer (b. 1913)
  2012   – Mark O'Donnell, American playwright (b. 1954)
  2012   – Ruggiero Ricci, American violinist and educator (b. 1918)
  2012   – Dan Roundfield, American basketball player (b. 1953)
2013 – Stan Lynde, American author and illustrator (b. 1931)
  2013   – Mava Lee Thomas, American baseball player (b. 1929)
  2013   – Jerry Wolman, American businessman (b. 1927)
2014 – Ralph Bryans, Northern Irish motorcycle racer (b. 1941)
  2014   – Ananda W.P. Guruge, Sri Lankan scholar and diplomat (b. 1928)
  2014   – John Woodland Hastings, American biochemist and academic (b. 1927)
2015 – Ray Hill, American football player (b. 1975)
  2015   – Orna Porat, German-Israeli actress (b. 1924)
2017 – Betty Cuthbert, Australian sprinter (b. 1938)
  2017   – Darren Daulton, American baseball player (b. 1962)
2018 – Joël Robuchon, French Chef (b. 1945) 
  2018   – Margaret Heckler, American politician (b. 1931)
  2018   – Anya Krugovoy Silver, American poet (b. 1968)

Holidays and observances
Blessed Anna Maria Rubatto
Hormisdas
Justus and Pastor
August 6 (Eastern Orthodox liturgics)
Sheikh Zayed bin Sultan Al Nahyan's Accession Day. (United Arab Emirates)
Independence Day (Bolivia), celebrates the independence of Bolivia from Spain in 1825.
Independence Day (Jamaica), celebrates the independence of Jamaica from the United Kingdom in 1962.
Hiroshima Peace Memorial Ceremony (Hiroshima, Japan)
Russian Railway Troops Day (Russia)

References

External links

 
 
 

Days of the year
August